Maitland is a census-designated place in Derry Township, Mifflin County, Pennsylvania, United States, just outside the borough of Lewistown. At the 2010 census, the population was 357.

Demographics

References

Census-designated places in Mifflin County, Pennsylvania
Census-designated places in Pennsylvania